Luke Johnson may refer to:

 Luke Johnson (businessman) (born 1962), British businessman and former chairman of the British Channel 4
 Luke Johnson (game designer), American game designer of role-playing games
 Luke Johnson (Mormon) (1807–1861), American leader in the Latter Day Saint movement
 Luke Johnson (musician) (born 1981), former drummer for the Welsh band Lostprophets
 Luke Johnson, inventor of the Luke Johnson Phone Experiment on YouTube
 Luke Timothy Johnson (born 1943), professor of theology
 Luke Johnson (ice hockey) (born 1994), professional ice hockey player
 Luke Johnson (tennis) (born 1994), British tennis player
 Luke S. Johnson (politician) (1847–1910), American politician and soldier